Moca-Croce is a commune in the Corse-du-Sud department of France on the island of Corsica.

Population

See also
Communes of the Corse-du-Sud department

References

Communes of Corse-du-Sud
Corse-du-Sud communes articles needing translation from French Wikipedia